Allocota is a genus of beetles in the family Carabidae, containing the following species:

 Allocota aurata (Bates, 1873)
 Allocota bicolor Shi & Liang, 2013
 Allocota cyanipennis Heller, 1923
 Allocota viridipennis Motschulsky, 1859

The following species have become synonyms:
 Allocota andrewesi (Jedlicka, 1934): Synonym of Physodera andrewesi (Jedlicka, 1934)
 Allocota arrowi (Jedlicka, 1935): Synonym of Diamella arrowi (Jedlicka, 1935)
 Allocota caerulea Andrewes, 1933: Synonym of Allocota viridipennis Motschulsky, 1859
 Allocota perlaeta Kirschenhofer, 1994: Synonym of Metallanchista perlaeta (Kirschenhofer, 1994)
 Allocota perroti (Jedlicka, 1963): Synonym of Allocota aurata (Bates, 1873)
 Allocota philippinensis (Jedlicka, 1935): Synonym of Paraphaea philippinensis (Jedlicka, 1935)

References

Lebiinae